Shmuel Tolkowsky (27 June 1886 - 19 December 1965) was a Belgian-born agronomist, Zionist and Israeli diplomat. He became the assistant to Chaim Weizmann and Nachum Sokolov, two important leaders of the Zionist Movement. Shmuel Tolkowsky himself was the son-in-law of Yitzhak Goldberg, a founder of the Jewish Foundation Fund.

Dan Tolkowsky was his son.

Born in Antwerp, Belgium, he emigrated to Israel in 1911.  He began serving as Consul General in Switzerland in 1949 until he was promoted to Minister in 1951.

Quotes

References

External links

Belgian Zionists
Recipients of the Order of the White Lion
Jewish scientists
Scientists from Antwerp
Israeli consuls
Ambassadors of Israel to Switzerland
1886 births
1965 deaths
Belgian emigrants to Mandatory Palestine